The 1973 Amateur World Series run by FEMBA ran parrelel to the 1973 Amateur World Series run by the FIBA in a period of international baseball conflict. Though the FEMBA event started and ended earlier, it went into the history books post-reconciliation as "Amateur World Series XXII" while the FIBA event was known as "Amateur World Series XXI". The FEMBA Series was held in Managua, Nicaragua from November 22 through December 5.

Final standings

References

Baseball World Cup, 1973
Baseball World Cup
1973
1973 in Nicaragua
Amateur World Series
Amateur World Series
Amateur World Series
1970s in Nicaraguan sport